Mycalesis rama, the Cingalese bushbrown, is a species of satyrine butterfly of family Nymphalidae. It is a very shy animal, distributed in bamboo forests. It is endemic to Sri Lanka.

Wingspan is about 56mm. Dorsal surface is dark brown with two eyespots at the sub marginal area. Lower eyespot is large, prominent and ringed with orange. Ventral surface is dull orange brown. Larval host plants include Ochlandra stridula and Bambusa species.

References

External links
A morphometric study of the Genus Mycalesis

Mycalesis
Butterflies of Asia
Butterflies of Singapore
Butterflies of Indochina